Makaji Meghpar (also known as Meghana) is a village and former chiefdom of Hardhrol Jadeja chieftains in the Jamnagar district of Gujarat, India. It was founded in 1754 by Makanji Jadeja of Dhrol State. Gujarati writer Harilal Upadhyay was from the village. The people are mainly Jadeja Rajputs with some Brahmins, Patels and Dalits.

History 

Makaji Meghpar was founded by Makanji Jadeja in 1754 as the capital of the chiefdom (Jagir). Until independence, this village was ruled under Nawanagar State.

Census
Makaji Meghpar is a medium size village located in Kalavad of Jamnagar district, with total 383 families residing. The Makaji Meghpar village has population of 1942 of which 983 are males while 959 are females as per Population Census 2011.

In Makaji Meghpar village population of children with age 0-6 is 259 which makes up 13.34% of total population of village. Average Sex Ratio of Makaji Meghpar village is 976 which is higher than Gujarat state average of 919. Child Sex Ratio for the Makaji Meghpar as per census is 837, lower than Gujarat average of 890. Makaji Meghpar village has lower literacy rate compared to Gujarat. In 2011, literacy rate of Makaji Meghpar village was 74.45% compared to 78.03% of Gujarat. In Makaji Meghpar Male literacy stands at 80.88% while female literacy rate was 68.01%.

Work Profile

In Makaji Meghpar village out of total population, 729 were engaged in work activities. 87.38% of workers describe their work as Main Work, while 12.62% were involved in Marginal activity providing livelihood for less than 6 months. Of 729 workers engaged in Main Work, 448 were cultivators while 116 were Agricultural labourer.

Data table

Castes
 

 
Schedule Caste (SC) constitutes 21.83% and Socially and Educationally Backward Caste constitutes 25.75% of total population in Makaji Meghpar village. The village Makaji Meghpar currently doesn't have any Schedule Tribe (ST) population. Forward Castes (Rajputs, Brahmins and Patels) constitutes 52.42% of the population of Makaji Meghpar.

Economy
Village's main activity is agriculture. Most of them are engaged in farming, producing main crops such as ground nuts, bajra, cotton, and wheat.

Administration
The village is administered by Makaji Meghpar Gram Panchayat which is headed by Sarpanch. Alabhai M. Gamara is an incumbent Sarpanch, Bharatiba Mayurdhvajsinh Jadeja is Upsarpanch.

Government and politics
Makaji Meghpar Gram Panchayat is the local government of the village. The panchayat has a total of 8 wards and each ward is represented by an elected ward member. The ward members are headed by a Sarpanch and the present Sarpanch is Alabhai Gamara. The secretary of the panchayat is Parakramsinh Jadeja.

Geography

Makaji Meghpar is located at 22.33°N 70.48°E. It has an average elevation of 53 metres (174 ft). The village is located on the bank of Domdi River and Und River. The village is spread in the area of 23.44 km². Makaji Meghpar is situated in the region called Saurashtra in the Gujarat state of India. Meghpar is the administrative headquarter of the Makaji Meghpar Rural Complex including Shivnagar, Mangalpur and Paru faubourgs.

Culture

All residents of Makaji Meghpar speak Gujarati language.

Religions

Hinduism is only religion in Makaji Meghpar.

Temples

The village has several Hindu temples, such as Aashapura Mataji Temple, Bhavani Mata Temple, Vaidyanath Mahadev Temple, Thakurji na Chora, Hanuman temple,shakti mata temple, etc. There are several Devdis ( small temples) dedicated to folk gods and goddesses of peasant and pastoral communities. These Devdis include sacred places dedicated to Meladi mata, Ramdeoji, machchho mata, khetaliya(kshetrapal) naag, sarmariya naag etc.

Sports
Cricket is the most popular sport in Makaji Meghpar. Other popular traditional sports include Kabaddi and Kho Kho.

Connectivity

The Makaji Meghpar Rural Complex is connected with Paddhari, Kalavad and surrounding villages with single lane paved road. Rajkot Airport is nearest Airport. Hadmatiya junction and Paddhari are nearly railway stations.

References

External links
 Imperial Gazetteer, on dsal.uchicago.edu

Villages in Jamnagar district
States and territories established in 1754
1754 establishments in India
Princely states of Gujarat
Rajput princely states